This is a list of the main career statistics of professional Romanian tennis player Simona Halep.

Performance timelines

Only main-draw results in WTA Tour, Grand Slam tournaments, Fed Cup/Billie Jean King Cup and Olympic Games are included in win–loss records.

Singles
Current after the 2022 US Open.

Doubles
This table is current through the 2022 Australian Open.

Grand Slam tournament finals

Singles: 5 (2 titles, 3 runner-ups)

Other significant finals

WTA Tour Championships finals

Singles: 1 (1 runner-up)

WTA 1000 finals

Singles: 18 (9 titles, 9 runner-ups)

Doubles: 1 (1 runner-up)

WTA career finals

Singles: 42 (24 titles, 18 runner-ups)

Doubles: 2 (1 title, 1 runner-up)

ITF Circuit finals

Singles: 8 (6 titles, 2 runner–ups)

Doubles: 4 (4 titles)

WTA Tour career earnings
Current after the 2022 US Open.

Career Grand Slam statistics

Grand Slam tournament seedings
The tournaments won by Halep are in boldface, and advanced into finals by Halep are in italics.

Best Grand Slam tournament results details
Grand Slam winners are in boldface, and runner–ups are in italics.

Record against other players

Record against top 10 players
Halep's record against players who have been ranked in the top 10. Active players are in boldface:

Record against No. 11–20 players 
Halep's record against players who have been ranked world No. 11–20. Active ones are in boldface.

 Anastasia Pavlyuchenkova 8–0
 Kirsten Flipkens 6–0
 Barbora Strýcová 6–1
 Anastasija Sevastova 6–3
 Alison Riske 4–0
 Sabine Lisicki 4–1
 Elise Mertens 4–2
 Magdaléna Rybáriková 4–2
 Alisa Kleybanova 3–0
 Donna Vekić 3–0
 Jennifer Brady 3–0
 Beatriz Haddad Maia 3–1
 Daria Gavrilova 3–1
 Petra Martić 3–1
 Ekaterina Alexandrova 3–2
 Eleni Daniilidou 2–0
 Mihaela Buzărnescu 2–0
 Varvara Lepchenko 2–0
 Wang Qiang 2–0
 Kaia Kanepi 2–1
 Klára Koukalová 2–1
 Yanina Wickmayer 2–3
 Alizé Cornet 2–4
 Ana Konjuh 1–0
 Anne Kremer 1–0
 Karolína Muchová 1–0
 Peng Shuai 1–0
 Elena Vesnina 1–1
 María José Martínez Sánchez 1–1
 Tamarine Tanasugarn 1–1
 Markéta Vondroušová 1–2
 Anabel Medina Garrigues 1–4
 Aravane Rezaï 0–1
 Elena Bovina 0–1
 Karolina Šprem 0–1
 Sybille Bammer 0–1
 Virginie Razzano 0–1
 Mirjana Lučić-Baroni 0–2

* Statistics correct .

No. 1 wins

Top 10 wins

Double bagel matches (6–0, 6–0)

Longest winning streaks

17 match win streak (2020)

See also
2018 Simona Halep tennis season
2019 Simona Halep tennis season

Notes

References

External links
 
 
 

Simona Halep
Halep, Simona